Lyndon Spencer (January 26, 1898 – April 12, 1981) was a Vice Admiral in the United States Coast Guard.

Career
Spencer graduated from the United States Coast Guard Academy in 1918.

From 1922 to 1925, he served on the staff at the Coast Guard Academy.

While in command, the Bayfield served as the flagship of the Naval Task Force during Operation Overlord. For his services during this time, Spencer was awarded the Legion of Merit and the Croix de Guerre of France.

Later in his career Spencer served as the president of the Lake Carriers' Association, an organization tasked with representing the interests of U.S.-flag vessel operators on the Great Lakes.

References

Connecticut Death Index, 1949-2001

1898 births
1981 deaths
People from Steuben County, New York
United States Coast Guard admirals
United States Coast Guard Academy alumni
United States Coast Guard personnel of World War II
Recipients of the Legion of Merit
Recipients of the Croix de Guerre 1939–1945 (France)